Arjit Gupta (born 12 September 1989) is an Indian first-class cricketer who plays for Rajasthan.

References

External links
 

1989 births
Living people
Indian cricketers
Rajasthan cricketers
People from Sri Ganganagar district